Hunduwa is a small town in the Bombali District in the Northern Province of Sierra Leone.

Populated places in Sierra Leone
Northern Province, Sierra Leone